Apis mellifera adami is a western honey bee subspecies, endemic to the island of Crete in the eastern Mediterranean.

Taxonomy
The Apis mellifera adami was classified by Ruttner 1975 and named by him after Brother Adam.

Research in 2003 concluded that "the honey bee from Crete seems to be similar to the honey bee populations from other areas of Greece" while yet acknowledging that their genetic structures had most likely been changed over the past two decades due to migratory beekeeping and commercial breeding, concluding that there seemed to be no pure populations of A. m. adami left on the island.

Beekeeping
Western Cretan beehives are constructed of terracotta, wood and wicker. On the east of the island the hives are always ceramic.

See also
 Bee domestication and Beekeeping

References 

Friedrich Ruttner (1975). Die Kretische Biene, Apis mellifica adami [The Cretan bee]. Deutsche Allgemeine Imkerzeitung, 9 (10), pp. 271–272.

External links
A.Gönülşen THE MIDDLE EAST TECHNICAL UNIVERSITY  FEATURE EXTRACTION OF HONEYBEE FOREWINGS AND HINDLEGS USING IMAGE PROCESSING AND ACTIVE CONTOURS Middle East Technical University2004 [Retrieved 2011-12-20] thesis states that A.m.adamii populate Cyprus
G. W. Elderkin  The Bee of Artemis The American Journal of Philology Vol. 60, No. 2 (1939), pp. 203–213 (article consists of 11 pages) Published by: The Johns Hopkins University Press → JSTOR (part of ITHAKA)

mellifera adami
Western honey bee breeds